HCSS is the 10th studio album by Swedish hard rock band Hardcore Superstar, released on 22 April 2015 on Gain Records (Victor in Japan, and Sony Music in Finland).  It is the first Hardcore Superstar album to feature a guest performer (Swedish reggae singer Etzia on the song Touch the Sky), and she has performed the song live a few times with the band.  As with their previous album, all pre-orders of the album were signed by all four band members.  Following the release of HCSS the band embarked on their first North American tour in over 10 years co-headlining with Michael Monroe.

Track listing

Personnel
Hardcore Superstar
Jocke Berg - vocals
Vic Zino - guitar
Martin Sandvik - bass, vocals
Magnus "Adde" Andreason - drums

Production
Stefan Karlsson - engineer
Jakob Herrmann - co-engineer

Guest personnel
Etzia - vocals on Touch the Sky

References

Hardcore Superstar albums
2015 albums